Three is a 1965 Yugoslav film directed by Aleksandar Petrović. It was nominated for the Academy Award for Best Foreign Language Film at the 39th Academy Awards.

Cast
 Bata Živojinović as Miloš Bojanić
 Nikola-Kole Angelovski
 Stole Aranđelović
 Dragomir Bojanić
 Milan Jelić
 Branislav Jerinić as Komandir
 Laza Jovanović
 Mirjana Kodžić
 Vesna Krajina as Vera
 Voja Mirić as Partizan
 Slobodan Perović as Nevino optuženi
 Ali Raner as Mladić

Themes

The theme of the film is the death, in three forms: as witness of it, as a victim of it, and as an executor.
Three was the first Yugoslav movie released in the United States (in 1966).

Aleksandar Petrović's films Three and I Even Met Happy Gypsies provided the world an introduction to Yugoslav cinema. Unlike ‘Three’ it was very well received and translated in over 100 languages.

Reception 
A review from the New York Times from 1967 when it was nominated for Best Foreign Film at the Academy Awards:

"War’s utter bestiality and waste, usually illustrated by armies, is brought into sharp focus by a talented few in “Three,” a prize-winning Yugoslav drama that treats its bleak and harrowing subject with a grim but poetic artistry. It had a showing at the New York Film Festival last year, and is now at the Studio Cinema and 72d Street Theaters. The film is mystifyingly abrupt in its transitions, but its effects, physical and intellectual, are unmistakably forceful and chilling. The director, Aleksandar Petrovic, with the aid of a sparse script and stunning photography by Tomislav Pinter, has pointed up war’s ravages as it affects one partisan’s fights in one small sector of the conflict. In each of three events he is part of, needless death brought about by fear, despair and defeat."

Awards and honors 
 	Academy Awards Nomination for Best Foreign Language Film-  1966 (39th edition)
 -	XIIth Pula Film Festival (Yugoslavia), 1965: GRAND PRIX (Golden Arena) for Best Film, 
 -	XIIth Pula Film Festival (Yugoslavia), 1965: GRAND PRIX (Golden Arena) for Best Director
 -	XIIth Pula Film Festival (Yugoslavia), 1965: GRAND PRIX (Golden Arena) for Best Actor
 -	XIIth Pula Film Festival (Yugoslavia), 1965: Critics' Award “Milton Manaki” 
 -	Bronze Plaque (Bronzana Plaketa) – BUNINOVA  VRATA, Yugoslav award, 1965
 -	XVth Karlovy Vary (Karlsbad) International Festival, 1966 GRAND PRIX for Best Film (HLAVNA CENA I)
 -	IXth Acapulco Festival of Best Movies, 1966 - Award "PALENKA", Golden Inca Head
 -	Festival of Italian neorealism – Avellino, 1966 - Award LACENO D'ORO
 -	In 1979, in a survey organized by the Yugoslav Film Institute for The Best Film in the history of the Yugoslav Cinema, the Yugoslav Film Critics and Artists put Three in second place behind I Even Met Happy Gypsies, from Aleksandar Petrović, declared the Best Film in the History of Yugoslav Cinema.

See also
 List of submissions to the 39th Academy Awards for Best Foreign Language Film
 List of Yugoslav submissions for the Academy Award for Best Foreign Language Film

References

External links
 Official Website  
 Vlastimir Sudar:  Portrait de l’artiste en tant que dissident politique: La vie et l’œuvre d’Aleksandar Petrovic (The life and work of Aleksandar Petrovic: A portrait of the artist as a political dissident – INTELLECT, Bristol, INTELLECT, Chicago 2013)

1965 films
Yugoslav war comedy films
Serbo-Croatian-language films
1960s war comedy films
Films directed by Aleksandar Petrović
Serbian war comedy films
Avala Film films
Anti-war films about World War II
Films set in Serbia
War films set in Partisan Yugoslavia
Yugoslav World War II films
Serbian World War II films